Eliot Spizzirri and Tyler Zink were the defending champions, having won the previous edition in 2019, however both players were no longer eligible to participate in junior events. Spizzirri and Zink received a wildcard in the men's doubles event, where they lost in the first round.

Max Westphal and Coleman Wong won the title, defeating Viacheslav Bielinskyi and Petr Nesterov in the final, 6–3, 5–7, [10–1].

Seeds
All seeds received a bye into the second round.

Draw

Finals

Top half

Bottom half

References
Main Draw

Boys' Doubles
US Open, 2021 Boys' Doubles